The Cabinet is the executive branch of the government of the Independent State of Samoa.

Per article 31(1) of the Constitution, executive power is vested in the Head of State. Per article 26(1), however, "the Head of State in the performance of his functions shall act on the advice of Cabinet, the Prime Minister or the appropriate Minister, as the case may be". Article 32(1) provides that the Cabinet "shall have the general direction and control of the executive government" of Samoa.

The Cabinet is composed, per article 32(2), of the Prime Minister and "not fewer than eight nor more than twelve other Members of Parliament", appointed by the Head of State on the advice of the Prime Minister.

XVII Cabinet
This Cabinet was appointed by Fiamē Naomi Mataʻafa during the 2021 Samoan constitutional crisis following the April 2021 Samoan general election. The previous cabinet purported to continue in a caretaker role. On 23 July 2021 the Court of Appeal ruled that the swearing-in ceremony was constitutional and binding, and that FAST had been the government since 24 May.

Toeolesulusulu Cedric Schuster resigned on 3 June 2021 after being arrested for drink-driving. He returned to Cabinet on 20 October 2021, with the addition of the Tourism portfolio.

XVI Cabinet
This cabinet resulted from the March 2016 general election.

A cabinet reshuffle in April 2019 made the following ministerial changes:

 Dr Tuitama Talalelei Tuitama moves from the Minister of Health to the Minister for Women, Community and Social Development 
 Hon Faimalotoa Kika Stowers moves from the Minister for Women, Community and Social Development to the Minister of Health

XV Cabinet
As of March 2011. This Cabinet results from the March 2011 general election, which saw the Human Rights Protection Party retain an absolute majority of seats in Parliament. Its term corresponds to that of the Fifteenth Parliament. The minister's matai title precedes his or her name.

In April 2014, Finance Minister Faumuina Tiatia Liuga resigned, after some twenty years in Cabinet, following "allegations of abuse in the performance of his ministerial duties". Prime Minister Malielegaoi took over the Finance portfolio himself.

XIV Cabinet
This Cabinet resulted from the 2006 Samoan general election.

XIII Cabinet
This Cabinet resulted from the 2001 Samoan general election.

Tuu'u Anasi'i Leota was appointed Minister of Revenue and Ga'ina Tino was moved to Minister of Justice following the death of Seumanu Aita Ah Wa in January 2004.

References

Cabinet
Samoa